Auquilohuagra (possibly from awkillu, local Quechua word for deity, waqra horn) is an archaeological site in Peru. It is situated in the Huánuco Region, Yarowilca Province, Obas District. The site was declared part of the National Cultural Heritage of Peru in 2006.

See also 
Hualpayunca
Huichun

References 

Archaeological sites in Peru
Archaeological sites in Huánuco Region